Occupy Wall Street (OWS) was a 59-day left-wing populist movement against economic inequality and the influence of money in politics that had begun in Zuccotti Park, located in New York City's Wall Street financial district, and lasted from September 17–November 15, 2011. The protests gave rise to the wider Occupy movement in the United States and other Western countries.

The Canadian anti-consumerist magazine Adbusters initiated the call for a protest. The main issues raised by Occupy Wall Street were social and economic inequality, greed, corruption and the undue influence of corporations on government—particularly from the financial services sector. The OWS slogan, "We are the 99%", refers to income and wealth inequality in the U.S. between the wealthiest 1% and the rest of the population. To achieve their goals, protesters acted on consensus-based decisions made in general assemblies which emphasized redress through direct action over the petitioning to authorities.

The protesters were forced out of Zuccotti Park on November 15, 2011. Protesters then turned their focus to occupying banks, corporate headquarters, board meetings, foreclosed homes, college and university campuses and social media.

Origins
The original protest was called for by Kalle Lasn and others of Adbusters, a Canadian anti-consumerist publication, who conceived of a September 17 occupation in Lower Manhattan. The first such proposal appeared on the Adbusters website on February 2, 2011, under the title "A Million Man March on Wall Street." Lasn registered the OccupyWallStreet.org web address on June 9. The website redirected to www.adbusters.org/campaigns/occupywallstreet and www.adbusters.org/occupywallstreet, but is now "Not Found". In a blog post on July 13, 2011, Adbusters proposed a peaceful occupation of Wall Street to protest corporate influence on democracy, the lack of legal consequences for those who brought about the global crisis of monetary insolvency, and an increasing disparity in wealth. The protest was promoted with an image featuring a dancer atop Wall Street's iconic Charging Bull statue. In July, Justine Tunney registered OccupyWallSt.org which became the main online hub for the movement.

The U.S. Day of Rage, a group that organized to protest "corporate influence [that] corrupts our political parties, our elections, and the institutions of government", also joined the movement. The protest itself began on September 17; a Facebook page for the demonstrations began two days later on September 19 featuring a YouTube video of earlier events. By mid-October, Facebook listed 125 Occupy-related pages.

The original location for the protest was One Chase Manhattan Plaza, with Bowling Green Park (the site of the "Charging Bull") and Zuccotti Park as alternate choices. Police discovered this before the protest began and fenced off two locations; but they left Zuccotti Park, the group's third choice, open.  Since the park was private property, police could not legally force protesters to leave without being requested to do so by the property owner. At a press conference held the same day the protests began, New York City mayor Michael Bloomberg explained, "people have a right to protest, and if they want to protest, we'll be happy to make sure they have locations to do it."

More recent prototypes for OWS include the British student protests of 2010, 2009-2010 Iranian election protests, the Arab Spring protests, and, more closely related, protests in Chile, Greece, Spain and India. Occupy Wall Street, in turn, gave rise to the Occupy movement in the United States.

Many commentators have stated that the Occupy Wall Street movement has roots in the philosophy of anarchism.

Background

"We are the 99%" 

The Occupy protesters' slogan "We are the 99%" referred to the income disparity in the US and economic inequality in general, which were main issues for OWS. It derives from a "We the 99%" flyer calling for OWS's second General Assembly in August 2011. The variation "We are the 99%" originated from a Tumblr page of the same name. Huffington Post reporter Paul Taylor said the slogan was "arguably the most successful slogan since 'Hell no, we won't go!'" of the Vietnam War era, and that the vast majority of Americans saw the income gap as causing social friction. The slogan was boosted by statistics which were confirmed by a Congressional Budget Office (CBO) report released in October 2011. Writing in 2022, historian Gary Gerstle says that the slogan "proved surprisingly appealing" in a nation that, during its neoliberal high point, often denounced ideas of class warfare.

Income and wealth inequality

Income inequality and wealth inequality were focal points of the Occupy Wall Street protests. This focus by the movement was studied by Arindajit Dube and Ethan Kaplan of the University of Massachusetts Amherst, who noted that "... Only after it became increasingly clear that the political process was unable to enact serious reforms to address the causes or consequences of the economic crisis did we see the emergence of the OWS movement."

Goals 

OWS's goals included a reduction in the influence of corporations on politics, more balanced distribution of income, more and better jobs, bank reform (especially to curtail speculative trading by banks), forgiveness of student loan debt or other relief for indebted students, and alleviation of the foreclosure situation. Some media labeled the protests "anti-capitalist", while others disputed the relevance of this label.

Some protesters favored a fairly concrete set of national policy proposals. One OWS group that favored specific demands created a document entitled the 99 Percent Declaration, but this was regarded as an attempt to "co-opt" the "Occupy" name, and the document and group were rejected by the General Assemblies of Occupy Wall Street and Occupy Philadelphia.

During the occupation in Liberty Square, a declaration was issued with a list of grievances. The declaration stated that the "grievances are not all-inclusive".

Main organization 

The assembly was the main OWS decision-making body and used a modified consensus process, where participants attempted to reach consensus and then dropped to a 9/10 vote if consensus was not reached.

Assembly meetings involved OWS working groups and affinity groups, and were open to the public for both attendance and speaking. The meetings lacked formal leadership. Participants commented upon committee proposals using a process called a "stack", which is a queue of speakers that anyone can join. New York used a progressive stack, in which people from marginalized groups are sometimes allowed to speak before people from dominant groups. Facilitators and "stack-keepers" urged speakers to "step forward, or step back" based on which group they belong to, meaning that women and minorities often moved to the front of the line, while white men often had to wait for a turn to speak. In addition to the over 70 working groups, the organizational structure also included "spokes councils", at which every working group could participate.

The People's Library 

The People's Library at Occupy Wall Street was started a few days after the protest when a pile of books was left in a cardboard box at Zuccotti Park. The books were passed around and organized, and as time passed, it received additional books and resources from readers, private citizens, authors and corporations. As of November 2011 the library had 5,554 books cataloged in LibraryThing and its collection was described as including some rare or unique articles of historical interest. According to American Libraries, the library's collection had "thousands of circulating volumes", which included "holy books of every faith, books reflecting the entire political spectrum, and works for all ages on a huge range of topics."

The library was largely destroyed during the November 15, 2011 raid and, in a court settlement, the City later agreed to pay $360,000 in compensation, including attorney fees. Similarly, the City of New York has since begun settling cases with individual participants.

There were already libraries in the encampments of Spain and Greece. Following the example of the OWS People's Library, protesters throughout North America and Europe formed sister libraries at their encampments.

Zuccotti Park encampment

Prior to being closed to overnight use and during the occupation of the space, somewhere between 100 and 200 people slept in Zuccotti Park. Initially tents were not allowed and protesters slept in sleeping bags or under blankets. Meal service started at a total cost of about $1,000 per day. Many protesters used the bathrooms of nearby business establishments. Some supporters donated use of their bathrooms for showers and the sanitary needs of protesters.

New York City requires a permit to use "amplified sound", including electric bullhorns. Since Occupy Wall Street did not have a permit, the protesters created the "human microphone" in which a speaker pauses while the nearby members of the audience repeat the phrase in unison.

On October 13, New York City Mayor Bloomberg and Brookfield Properties announced that the park must be vacated for cleaning the following morning at 7 am. The next morning the property owner postponed its cleaning effort. Having prepared for a confrontation with the authorities to prevent the cleaning effort from proceeding, some protesters clashed with police in riot gear outside City Hall after it was canceled.

Shortly after midnight on November 15, 2011, the New York City Police Department gave protesters notice from the park's owner to leave Zuccotti Park due to its purportedly unsanitary and hazardous conditions. The notice stated that they could return without sleeping bags, tarps or tents. About an hour later, police in riot gear began removing protesters from the park, arresting some 200 people in the process, including a number of journalists.

On December 31, 2011, protesters started to re-occupy the park. Police in riot gear started to clear out the park around 1:30 am. Sixty-eight people were arrested in connection with the event, including one accused by media of stabbing a police officer in the hand with a pair of scissors.

When the Zuccotti Park encampment was closed, some former campers were allowed to sleep in local churches. Since the closure of the Zuccotti Park encampment, the movement has turned its focus on occupying banks, corporate headquarters, board meetings, foreclosed homes, college and university campuses, and Wall Street itself. Since its inception, the Occupy Wall Street protests in New York City have cost the city an estimated $17 million in overtime fees to provide policing of protests and encampment inside Zuccotti Park.

On March 17, 2012, Occupy Wall Street demonstrators attempted to mark the movement's six-month anniversary by reoccupying Zuccotti Park. Protesters were soon cleared away by police, who made over 70 arrests. On March 24, hundreds of OWS protesters marched from Zuccotti Park to Union Square in a demonstration against police violence.

On September 17, 2012, protesters returned to Zuccotti Park to mark the first anniversary of the beginning of the occupation. Protesters blocked access to the New York Stock Exchange as well as other intersections in the area. This, along with several violations of Zuccotti Park rules, led police to surround groups of protesters, at times pulling protesters from the crowds to be arrested for blocking pedestrian traffic. There were 185 arrests across the city.

Occupy media 

Occupy Wall Street activists disseminated their movement updates through variety of mediums, including social media, print magazines, newspapers, film, radio and live stream. Like much of Occupy, many of these alternative media projects were collectively managed, while autonomous from the decision-making bodies of Occupy Wall Street.

The Occupied Wall Street Journal (OWSJ) was a free newspaper founded in October 2011 by independent journalists Arun Gupta, Jed Brandt and Michael Levitin. The first issue had a total print run of 70,000 copies, along with an unspecified number in Spanish. Its last article appeared in February 2012.
The Occuprint collective, founded by Jesse Goldstein and Josh MacPhee, formed through the curation of the fourth and special edition of The Occupied Wall Street Journal (OWSJ). Afterwards, it continued to collect and publish images under the Creative Commons for non commercial use license, to spread the artwork throughout the movement.

The Occupy! Gazette was founded by editors Astra Taylor, Keith Gessen of n+1 and Sarah Leonard of Dissent Magazine. It published five issues from October 2011 to September 2012, with a commemorative sixth issue published in May 2014, to support OWS activist Cecily McMillan during the sentencing phase of her trial.

Tidal: Occupy Theory, Occupy Strategy magazine was published twice a year, with its first release in December 2011, the fourth and final issue in March 2013. It consisted of long essays, poetry and art within thirty pages. Each issue had a circulation of 12,000 to 50,000.

In Front and Center: Critical Voices in the 99% was a fully-online publication managed by an editorial collective of OWS participants. It featured critical essays and reflections from within OWS, aiming to put the voices, experiences and issues of oppressed and marginalized communities in the front and center of the Occupy movement. It is still available online.

Security, crime and legal issues
OWS demonstrators complained of thefts of assorted items such as cell phones and laptops; thieves also stole $2,500 of donations that were stored in a makeshift kitchen. In November, a man was arrested for breaking an EMT's leg.

After several weeks of occupation, protesters had made enough allegations of rape, sexual assault, and gropings that women-only sleeping tents were set up. Occupy Wall Street organizers released a statement regarding the sexual assaults stating, "As individuals and as a community, we have the responsibility and the opportunity to create an alternative to this culture of violence, We are working for an OWS and a world in which survivors are respected and supported unconditionally ... We are redoubling our efforts to raise awareness about sexual violence. This includes taking preventive measures such as encouraging healthy relationship dynamics and consent practices that can help to limit harm."

Economic Blockades and Cryptocurrency Donations

On 26 September 2011, the Internet payment intermediary PayPal suspended FeedTheProtest's donation account and froze its assets. In response, FeedTheProtest started accepting Bitcoin donations the following day to bypass the economic blockade. 

On 26 November 2011, occupywallst.org also started accepting bitcoin donations

Government crackdowns

Surveillance 

As the movement spread across the United States, the United States Department of Homeland Security (DHS) began keeping tabs on protesters, due to the fact that the protest was a potential source of violence. Following this, there was a DHS report entitled "SPECIAL COVERAGE: Occupy Wall Street", dated October 2011, observed that "mass gatherings associated with public protest movements can have disruptive effects on transportation, commercial, and government services, especially when staged in major metropolitan areas." The DHS keeps a file on the movement and monitors social media for information, according to leaked emails released by WikiLeaks.

On December 21, 2012, Partnership for Civil Justice obtained and published U.S. government documents revealing that over a dozen local FBI field offices, DHS and other federal agencies monitored Occupy Wall Street, despite labeling it a peaceful movement. The New York Times reported in May 2014 that declassified documents showed extensive surveillance of OWS related groups across the country.

Arrests 
The first person arrested was Alexander Arbuckle, a student videographer from New York University engaged in a class project. The police department alleged he was blocking the street. However, video shown at his trial showed the protesters including Arbuckle, had followed police orders and withdrew to the sidewalk. 

Gideon Oliver, who represented Occupy with the National Lawyers Guild in New York, said about 2,000 [protesters] had been arrested just in New York City alone. Most of these arrests in New York and elsewhere, are on charges of disorderly conduct, trespassing, and failure to disperse. Nationally, a little under 8,000 Occupy affiliated arrests have been documented by tallying numbers published in local newspapers.

In a report that followed an eight-month study, researchers at the law schools of NYU and Fordham accuse the NYPD of deploying unnecessarily aggressive force, obstructing press freedoms and making arbitrary and baseless arrests.

Brooklyn Bridge arrests 
On October 1, 2011, a large group of protesters set out to walk across the Brooklyn Bridge resulting in 768 arrests, the largest number of arrests in one day at any Occupy event. By October 2, all but 20 of the arrestees had been released with citations for disorderly conduct and a criminal court summons. On October 4, a group of protesters who were arrested on the bridge filed a lawsuit against the city, alleging that officers had violated their constitutional rights by luring them into a trap and then arresting them.

In June 2012, a federal judge ruled that the protesters had not received sufficient warning.

Court cases 
Video of his arrest was convincing evidence in Alexander Arbuckle's acquittal. 

In 2011, eight men associated with Occupy Wall Street were found guilty of trespassing, having intended to set up a camp on property controlled by Trinity Church. One was also convicted of attempted criminal mischief and attempted criminal possession of burglar's tools for trying to slice a lock on a chain-link fence with bolt cutters, spending a month in prison. The rest were sentenced to community service.

In May 2012, three cases in a row were thrown out of court, the most recent one for "insufficient summons".

One defendant, Michael Premo, charged with assaulting an officer, was found not guilty after the defense presented video evidence which "showed officers charging into the defendant unprovoked", contradicting the sworn testimony of NYPD officers.

In April 2014, the final Occupy court case, the Trial of Cecily McMillan began. Cecily McMillan was charged with and convicted of assaulting a police officer and sentenced to 90 days in Rikers Island Penitentiary. McMillan claimed the assault was an accident and a response to what she claimed to be a sexual assault at the hands of said officer. The jury that found her guilty recommended no jail time. She was released after serving 60 days.

Notable responses

During an October 6 news conference, President Barack Obama said, "I think it expresses the frustrations the American people feel, that we had the biggest financial crisis since the Great Depression, huge collateral damage all throughout the country ... and yet you're still seeing some of the same folks who acted irresponsibly trying to fight efforts to crack down on the abusive practices that got us into this in the first place."

On October 5, 2011, noted commentator and political satirist Jon Stewart said in his Daily Show broadcast: "If the people who were supposed to fix our financial system had actually done it, the people who have no idea how to solve these problems wouldn't be getting shit for not offering solutions."

Republican presidential candidate Mitt Romney said that while there were "bad actors" that needed to be "found and plucked out", he believes that targeting one industry or region of America is a mistake, and said the Occupy Wall Street protests are "dangerous" and inciting "class warfare". A week later, Romney expressed empathy for the movement, saying, "I look at what's happening on Wall Street and my view is, boy, I understand how those people feel."

House Democratic Leader Rep. Nancy Pelosi said she supports the Occupy Wall Street movement. In September, various labor unions, including the Transport Workers Union of America Local 100 and the New York Metro 32BJ Service Employees International Union, pledged their support for demonstrators.

In November 2011, Public Policy Polling did a national survey which found that 33% of voters supported OWS and 45% opposed it, with 22% not sure. 43% of those polled had a higher opinion of the Tea Party movement than the Occupy movement. In January 2012, a survey was released by Rasmussen Reports, in which 51% of likely voters found protesters to be a public nuisance, while 39% saw it as a valid protest movement representing the people.

Many notable figures joined the occupation, including David Crosby, Kanye West, Russell Simmons, Alec Baldwin, Susan Sarandon, Don King, Noam Chomsky, Jesse Jackson, Cornel West, Judith Butler, and Michael Moore.

Time Magazine: Person of the Year 2011 
OWS was mentioned by Time Magazine in its 2011 selection of "The Protester" as Person of the Year.

Criticism
A number of criticisms of Occupy Wall Street have emerged, both during the movement's most active period and subsequently after. These criticism include a lack of clear goals, false claim as the 99%, a lack of measurable change, trouble conveying its message, a failure to continue its support base, pursuing the wrong audience, and accusations of anti-Semitism.

The Occupy Movement has been criticized for not having a set of clear demands that could be used to prompt formal policy change. This lack of agenda has been cited as the reason why the Occupy Movement fizzled before achieving any specific legislative changes. Although the lack of demands has simultaneously been argued as one of the advantages of the movement, the protesters in Occupy rejected the idea of having only one demand, or a set of demands, and instead represented a host of broad demands that did not specifically allude to a desired policy agenda.

Although the movement's primary slogan was "We are the 99%," it was criticized for not encompassing the voice of the entire 99%, specifically lower class individuals and minorities. For example, it was characterized as being overwhelmingly white and poorly representative of the needs of the immigrant population. The lack of African American presence was especially notable, with the movement being criticized in several news outlets and journal articles for its lack of inclusivity and racial diversity.

Some publications mentioned that the Occupy Wall Street Movement failed to spark any true institutional changes in banks and in Corporate America. This idea is supported by the number of scandals that continued to emerge following the financial crisis such as the London Whale incident, the LIBOR-fixing scandal, and the HSBC money laundering discovery. Furthermore, the idea of excess compensation through salaries and bonuses at Wall Street banks continued to be a contentious topic following the Occupy protests, especially as bonuses increased during a period of falling bank profits.

The movement was also criticized for not building a sustainable base of support and instead fading quickly after its initial spark in late 2011 through early 2012. This may be attributed to Occupy's lack of legislative victories, which left the protestors with a lack of measurable goals. It was also argued that the movement was too tied to its base, Zuccotti Park. Evidence of this lies in the fact that when the police evicted the protestors on November 15, the movement largely dissipated. While there is evidence that the movement had an enduring impact, protests and direct mentions of the Occupy movement quickly became uncommon.

Some Occupy Wall Street protests have included anti-zionist and or anti-Semitic slogans and signage such as "Jews control Wall Street" or "Zionist Jews who are running the big banks and the Federal Reserve". As a result, the Occupy movement has been confronted with accusations of anti-Semitism by major US media outlets and US politicians.

Subsequent activity
Occupy Wall Street mounted an ambitious call for a citywide general strike and day of action on May 1, 2012. Tens of thousands of people participated in a march through New York City, demonstrating continued support for Occupy Wall Street's cause and concerns.

Occupy Sandy was an organized relief effort created to assist the victims of Hurricane Sandy in the northeastern United States, made up of former and present Occupy Wall Street protesters, other members of the Occupy movement, and former non-Occupy volunteers.

To celebrate the third anniversary of the occupation of Zuccotti Park, an Occupy Wall Street campaign called "Strike Debt" announced it had wiped out almost $4 million in student loans, amounting to the indebtedness of 2,761 students. The loans were all held by students of Everest College, a for profit college that operates Corinthian Colleges, Inc. which in turn owns Everest University, Everest Institute, Heald College, and WyoTech. Strike Debt, and a successor organization, The Debt Collective, were active in organizing the Corinthian 100 students who struck against Corinthian college, a for-profit school that was shut down by the U.S. Department of Education.

Occupy the SEC came together during the occupation. The group seeks to represent the 99% in the regulatory process. They first attracted attention in 2012 when they submitted a 325-page comment letter on the Volcker Rule portion of Dodd Frank.

Another offshoot of the Occupy Movement, calling itself the OWS Alternative Banking Group, was established during the occupation of Zuccotti Park in 2011.

Influence on movement for higher wages and other influences
In 2013, commentators described Occupy Wall Street as having influenced the fast food worker strikes. Occupy Wall Street organizers also contributed to a worker campaign at Hot and Crusty cafe in New York City, helping them obtain higher wages and the right to form a union by working with a worker center. Occupy Wall Street has been credited with reintroducing a strong emphasis on income inequality into broad political discourse and, relatedly, for inspiring the fight for a $15 minimum wage.

In 2021, on the 10th anniversary of Occupy Wall Street, The Atlantic listed several long-term influences of the protests, including "Reinventing Activism" by encouraging "a generation to take to the streets and demand systemic reforms", influencing the Green New Deal, influencing activism for higher minimum wages, and "shifting the window of what is deemed politically acceptable discourse and pulling the nation to the left."

See also

 1932 Bonus army
 1968 Poor People's Campaign
 15 October 2011 global protests
 2011 protests in Spain
 2011 United States public employee protests
 2011 Wisconsin protests
 2013 protests in Brazil
 2013 protests in Turkey
 2014 Hong Kong protests
 Occupy Galle Face
 Capitol Hill Occupied Protest
 GameStop short squeeze
 List of incidents of civil unrest in the United States
 List of Occupy movement topics
 List of protests in the 21st century
 Nuit Debout
 Post-democracy
 Radical media
 UC Davis pepper-spray incident

References

Explanatory notes

Citations

Further reading

External links

 Occupy Wall Street Audio Collection, Tamiment Library and Robert F. Wagner Labor Archives at New York University Special Collections
 Occupy Wall Street Archives Working Group Records

 
2011 in economics
2011 politics in New York (state)
2011 protests
Anarchism in the United States
Anti-capitalism
Anti-fascism
Financial District, Manhattan
Internet memes
Internet-based activism
Occupy movement in the United States
Progressivism in the United States
Protests in New York (state)
Riots and civil disorder in New York City
September 2011 events in the United States
Social movements in the United States
Socialism in the United States
Police brutality in the United States